Archaeospheniscus lowei is the type species of the extinct penguin genus Archaeospheniscus. It stood approximately 85–115 cm high, between a modern king penguin and an emperor penguin in size. It is known from bones of a single individual (Otago Museum C.47.20) and possibly some additional material such as the OM C.47.27 femur, all recovered from the Late Oligocene Kokoamu Greensand Formation (27-28 MYA) at Duntroon, New Zealand.

The species' binomen was given in honor of Percy Lowe, who researched prehistoric penguins and proposed a theory (now considered erroneous) that these birds were derived from reptiles independently of the other modern birds.

References

 Marples, Brian J. (1952): Early Tertiary penguins of New Zealand. New Zealand Geol. Surv., Paleont. Bull. 20: 1-66.
 Simpson, George Gaylord (1971): A review of the pre-Pleistocene penguins of New Zealand. Bulletin of the American Museum of Natural History 144: 319–378. PDF fulltext

Archaeospheniscus
Extinct birds of New Zealand
Extinct penguins
Oligocene birds
Taxa named by Brian John Marples